Trelicia Abeykoon (born 14 October 1934 – died 26 April 1999 as ට්‍රිලිෂියා ගුණවර්ධන)), popularly as Trelicia or Trilicia Gunawardena, was an actress in Sri Lankan cinema, theater and television as well as a singer. She is best known for the critically acclaimed roles in films Gamperaliya, Nidhanaya, Kaliyagaya and Beddegama.

Personal life
She was born on 14 October 1934 at Kolonnawa, Sri Lanka. She completed school education from St. Anthony's Balika Vidyalaya, Dematagoda and Musaeus College, Colombo. Then she graduated with an honors degree from University of Peradeniya and worked as a teacher at Ananda Shasthralaya, Kotte. She also worked as a lecturer in the Aesthetic department at Peradeniya University as well as University of Kelaniya. She also worked as an English Instructor at the University of the Visual and Performing Arts.

She was married to Prof. A. J. Gunawardena, an English art critic and lecturer in the English Department at the then Vidyalankara University (Kelaniya University). He also worked as a screenwriter for the films Kaliyugaya and Baddegama.

She died on 26 April 1999 at the age of 64. Her body was cremated at General Cemetery, Borella.

Career
Her drama career started with U.A.S Perera's Lama Pitiya program in Radio Ceylon. She sang the song Surathal Nangiye with U.A.S Perera and W. A. Wijepala in 1939. Then in 1956, Gunawardena entered to stage drama with the main role as the first queen in play Maname by Ediriweera Sarachchandra. She starred in Prof. Sarachchandra's Hasthikantha Manthare, Dayananda Gunawardena's Naribana and Mahagama Sekera's Kundalakeshi.

Her maiden cinematic experience came through 1963 blockbuster movie Gamperaliya directed by award winning filmmaker Lester James Peries. Later she appeared in several critics acclaimed films such as Mado Doova, Baddegama, Nidhanaya, Gehenu Lamai, Nomiyena Minisun, Tharanaya and Loku Duwa. Among them, her role of 'Anula' in the film Kaliyugaya, was called by film critics as her greatest role. In 1984, she won the Sarasaviya Award for Best Supporting Actress, and later won the Presidential Award for the role. She was also awarded the Certificate of Live Cinematic Merit at the OICC Honors Ceremony.

She also starred in several teledramas including her role as 'Lucy Hami' in the drama Giraya was highly praised by the critics. The teledrama, which aired on television for 10 consecutive weeks, is based on a novel by Punyakanthi Wijenayake. Then she acted in the teledrama Beddegedara directed by Sudath Rohana and later won an OCIC award for her role as a mother. She later joined English dramas and starred in the Belgian play Caligula produced by the Professor Rudy Corrense.

As an author, she translated R. Ananthamurthy's Kannada novel 'Sanskara' into Sinhala.

Notable theater works

 Maname
 Nari Bena
 Sinhabahu
 Kundalakeshi

Notable television works

 Giraya
 Badde Gedara

Filmography

References

External links
 Songs by Trilicia Gunawardena

Sri Lankan film actresses
1934 births
1999 deaths